Briony Williams is an Australian actress. She is best known for her role as Joy, mother to Lockie and Phillip, in Lockie Leonard. She has appeared in the film "Struck by Lightning", and the TV Series All Saints.  She has also appeared in stage productions, including Macbeth.

Filmography

References

External links

Living people
Australian television actresses
1967 births